By Heart is Brenda K. Starr's third released in 1991 on Epic Records. The only single released was "If You Could Read My Mind."

Track listing

References

1991 albums
Brenda K. Starr albums
Albums produced by Guy Roche
Albums produced by Ric Wake